Bijeljani is a village in the municipality of Bileća, Republika Srpska, Bosnia and Herzegovina. According to the 1991 census the village had a population of 138 people. A monastery was once located in Bijeljani, Dabarsko polje, Stolac. There is also a mosque in the village.

References

Villages in Republika Srpska
Populated places in Bileća